Celeste Dring is an English comedy writer and actress, best known for her roles as Lauren Richards in the BBC TV series Wanderlust and as Princess Eugenie in Channel 4's The Windsors.

Early life
Celeste Dring is from Wolverhampton, England. She studied English at the University of Cambridge and graduated in July 2010. Dring started her career as a dance director at the Central Youth Theatre, Wolverhampton.

Comedy career
Dring started working with Freya Parker and Ed Kiely in the fringe theatre trio Lebensmüde. The trio performed at the 2013 Edinburgh Festival. After Ed left, Dring and Parker continued as a duo under the name Lazy Susan, earning a nomination for the comedy newcomer award at the 2014 Edinburgh Festival Fringe.
In 2016, Dring landed a main role as Princess Eugenie in Channel 4's The Windsors alongside actress Ellie White, who plays her royal sister Princess Beatrice. Dring has stated that she based her character on the stars of  Made in Chelsea rather than the real-life Princess Eugenie.

Dring appeared as Kayleigh Hudson, a regular character in the BBC3 comedy series This Country in 2018. She also appeared as Laura in BBC's Wanderlust the same year.

As a voice actor Dring had a speaking role in BBC Radio 4's Sketchorama (2015) and Newsjack (2017).

2022 saw a reboot of Lazy Susan on BBC Three with her long-term comedy partner Freya Parker for four 14-minute episodes.

Filmography

Film

Television

Radio

References

External links
IMDb Celeste Dring
Lazy Susan
United Talent

21st-century English actresses
Alumni of the University of Cambridge
English film actresses
English television actresses
Living people
Year of birth missing (living people)